Sai Noi is the northwesternmost district (amphoe) of Nonthaburi province, central Thailand.

Geography
Neighboring districts are (from the north clockwise): Lat Bua Luang (Phra Nakhon Si Ayutthaya province); Lat Lum Kaeo (Pathum Thani province); Bang Bua Thong, Bang Yai, and the districts Phutthamonthon and Bang Len of Nakhon Pathom province.

History
At first the area was administered from Bang Bua Thong District. On 1 January 1948 four sub-districts were split off to form the new minor district (king amphoe) Sai Noi. On 6 June 1956 it was elevated to full district status.

In 1959 Tambon Khun Si was transferred from Bang Len District (Nakhon Pathom) to become part of Sai Noi.

In 1979 the southern part of Tambon Rat Niyom formed the new tambon, Khlong Khwang. The following year the southern part of Tambon Sai Noi was split off to create Tambon Thawi Watthana.

Economy
One of the world's leading tropical seed companies, East-West Seed (EWS), has its global headquarters in the district. EWS was named the world's top-ranked number seed provider to smallholder farmers by the Amsterdam-based Access to Seeds Foundation.

Most areas of Sai Noi are still rural. Most residents have a rice farming career.

Administration
The district is divided into seven sub-districts (tambons), which are further subdivided into 68 villages (mubans). Sai Noi itself has sub-district municipality status (thesaban tambon) which covers parts of tambons Sai Noi and Khlong Khwang. There are a further seven tambon administrative organizations (TAO).

References

External links
amphoe.com (Thai)

Sai Noi